Pervomaysky District is the name of several administrative and municipal divisions of Russia. The districts are generally named for International Workers' Day, which is celebrated on May 1.

Districts of the federal subjects 

 Pervomaysky District, Altai Krai, an administrative and municipal district of Altai Krai
 Pervomaysky District, Orenburg Oblast, an administrative and municipal district of Orenburg Oblast
 Pervomaysky District, Tambov Oblast, an administrative and municipal district of Tambov Oblast
 Pervomaysky District, Tomsk Oblast, an administrative and municipal district of Tomsk Oblast
 Pervomaysky District, Yaroslavl Oblast, an administrative and municipal district of Yaroslavl Oblast
 Pervomaysky District, Republic of Crimea, a district in the Republic of Crimea, a territory disputed between Russia and Ukraine

City divisions 
 Pervomaysky City District, Izhevsk, a city district of Izhevsk, the capital of the Udmurt Republic
 Pervomaysky City District, Kirov, a city district of Kirov, the administrative center of Kirov Oblast
 Pervomaysky Administrative Okrug, an administrative okrug of the city of Murmansk, the administrative center of Murmansk Oblast
 Pervomaysky City District, Novosibirsk, a city district of Novosibirsk, the administrative center of Novosibirsk Oblast
 Pervomaysky City District, Penza, a city district of Penza, the administrative center of Penza Oblast
 Pervomaysky City District, Rostov-on-Don, a city district of Rostov-on-Don, the administrative center of Rostov Oblast
 Pervomaysky City District, Vladivostok, a city district of Vladivostok, the administrative center of Primorsky Krai

Historical districts 
 Pervomaysky District, Nizhny Novgorod Oblast, a former administrative and municipal district of Nizhny Novgorod Oblast; in terms of the administrative divisions transformed into a town of oblast significance, and in terms of the municipal divisions transformed into an urban okrug in July 2012

See also 
 Pervomaysky (disambiguation)
 Pervomaysky Okrug (disambiguation)
 Pervomaysk (disambiguation)
 Pervoye Maya (disambiguation)

References